The 6th Airborne Division order of battle lists only those units assigned to the division; units attached only for short periods of time are not included.

The 6th Airborne Division was the second of two airborne divisions formed by the British Army during the Second World War. Raised in 1943, the division fought in the Normandy landings (Capture of the Caen canal and Orne river bridges, Operation Tonga, Operation Mallard, Battle of Breville), the Battle of the Bulge in December 1944 and January 1945. The division then participated in Operation Varsity, the second airborne assault over the River Rhine during the war. Afterwards the division advanced north to the Baltic sea, reaching Wismar by the end of the war.

In the immediate post war period the 1st Airborne Division was disbanded leaving the 6th as the only airborne division in the British Army. Near the end of 1945, the division was named the Imperial Strategic Reserve and posted to the Middle East and deployed in an internal security role, during unrest in the British mandate of Palestine. By 1948, the British Army numbers had returned to peace time levels and the division was disbanded leaving the independent 2nd Parachute Brigade as the only regular army airborne formation.

Order of battle

Second World War

The Second World War formation, that participated in the Normandy landings, and Rhine Crossing.
 3rd Parachute Brigade
 8th (Midlands) Parachute Battalion
 9th (Eastern and Home Counties) Parachute Battalion
 1st Canadian Parachute Battalion
 5th Parachute Brigade
 7th (Light Infantry) Parachute Battalion
 12th (Yorkshire) Parachute Battalion
 13th (Lancashire) Parachute Battalion
 6th Airlanding Brigade
 12th Devonshire Regiment
 2nd Oxfordshire and Buckinghamshire Light Infantry
 1st Royal Ulster Rifles
 Divisional troops
 6th Airborne Armoured Reconnaissance Regiment
 53rd (Worcester Yeomanry) Airlanding Light Regiment, Royal Artillery
 2nd Forward Observer Unit, Royal Artillery
 3rd Airlanding Anti-Tank Battery, Royal Artillery
 4th Airlanding Anti-Tank Battery, Royal Artillery
 2nd Airlanding Light Anti-Aircraft Battery, Royal Artillery
 3rd Parachute Squadron, Royal Engineers
 591st Parachute Squadron, Royal Engineers
 249th Field Company. Royal Engineers
 286th Field Park Company, Royal Engineers
 6th Airborne Division Postal Unit, Royal Engineers
 6th Airborne Divisional Signals
 22st Independent Parachute Company (Pathfinders)
 127th (Parachute) Field Ambulance
 224th (Parachute) Field Ambulance
 195th (Airlanding) Field Ambulance
 63rd Company, Royal Army Service Corps
 398th Company, Royal Army Service Corps
 716th Company, Royal Army Service Corps
 6th Airborne Division Ordnance Field Park
 6th Airborne Division Workshop
 6th Airborne Division Provost Company
 245 Provost Company, Headquarters, Corps of Military Police (6th Airborne Division)

1946

This represents the division formation on arrival in the Middle East.
 2nd Parachute Brigade
 4th Parachute Battalion
 5th (Scottish) Parachute Battalion
 6th (Royal Welch) Parachute Battalion
 3rd Parachute Brigade
 3rd Parachute Battalion
 8th (Midlands) Parachute Battalion
 9th (Eastern and Home Counties) Parachute Battalion
 6th Airlanding Brigade
 2nd Oxfordshire and Buckinghamshire Light Infantry
 1st Royal Ulster Rifles
 1st Argyll and Sutherland Highlanders
 Divisional troops
 6th Airborne Armoured Reconnaissance Regiment
 53rd (Worcester Yeomanry) Airlanding Light Regiment
 2nd Airlanding Anti-Tank Regiment
 2nd Forward Observer Unit
 1st Airborne Squadron, Royal Engineers
 9th Airborne Squadron, Royal Engineers
 286th Airborne Park squadron, Royal Engineers
 6th Airborne Division Postal Unit, Royal Engineers
 6th Airborne Divisional Signals
 21st Independent Parachute Company
 63rd Composite Company (Airborne), Royal Army Service Corps
 398th Composite Company (Airborne), Royal Army Service Corps
 716th Company (Airborne Light), Royal Army Service Corps
 127th (Parachute) Field Ambulance
 224th (Parachute) Field Ambulance
 195th (Airlanding) Field Ambulance
 74th Field Hygiene section
 6th Airborne Division Ordnance, Field Park Royal Army Ordnance Corps
 6th Airborne Division Workshops. Royal Electrical and Mechanical Engineers
 6th Airborne Division Battle School
 6th Airborne Division Training School
 6th Airborne Division Provost Company
 317th Field Security Section
 16th Field Cash Office (Light)
 6th Airborne Division Air Photographic Interpretation Section
 2nd Mobile Photographic Enlargement Section

1947
By January 1947, the 6th Airlanding Brigade, the 6th Airborne Armoured Reconnaissance Regiment, the 21st Independent Parachute Company had been disbanded and the 286th Airborne Park Squadron were renumbered the 249th.
 1st Parachute Brigade
 1st Parachute Battalion
 2nd Parachute Battalion
 17th Parachute Battalion
 2nd Parachute Brigade
 4th Parachute Battalion
 5th (Scottish) Parachute Battalion
 6th (Royal Welch) Parachute Battalion
 3rd Parachute Brigade
 3rd Parachute Battalion
 8th (Midlands) Parachute Battalion
 9th (Eastern and Home Counties) Parachute Battalion
 Divisional troops
 3rd The King's Own Hussars
 53rd (Worcester Yeomanry) Airlanding Light Regiment
 2nd Airlanding Anti-Tank Regiment
 2nd Forward Observer Unit
 1st Airborne Squadron, Royal Engineers
 9th Airborne Squadron, Royal Engineers
 249th Airborne Park Squadron, Royal Engineers
 6th Airborne Division Postal Unit, Royal Engineers
 6th Airborne Divisional Signals
 No. 1 Wing, Glider Pilot Regiment
 63rd Composite Company (Airborne), Royal Army Service Corps
 398th Composite Company (Airborne), Royal Army Service Corps
 716th Company (Airborne Light), Royal Army Service Corps
 127th (Parachute) Field Ambulance
 224th (Parachute) Field Ambulance
 195th (Airlanding) Field Ambulance
 74th Field Hygiene section
 6th Airborne Division Ordnance, Field Park Royal Army Ordnance Corps
 6th Airborne Division Workshops. Royal Electrical and Mechanical Engineers
 6th Airborne Division Battle School
 6th Airborne Division Training School
 6th Airborne Division Provost Company
 317th Field Security Section
 16th Field Cash Office (Light)
 6th Airborne Division Air Photographic Interpretation Section
 2nd Mobile Photographic Enlargement Section

1948
The division had been reduced to two parachute brigades and supporting troops, the majority of which served in Palestine, while the 2nd Parachute Brigade was based in England.
 1st Parachute Brigade
 1st Parachute Battalion
 2nd/3rd Parachute Battalion
 8th/9th Parachute Battalion
 2nd Parachute Brigade (Based in England)
 4th/6th Parachute Battalion
 5th (Scottish) Parachute Battalion
 7th (Light Infantry) Parachute Battalion
 Divisional troops
 3rd The King's Own Hussars
 33rd Airborne Light Regiment
 66th Airlanding Anti-Tank Regiment
 334th Forward Observer Unit
 1st Airborne Squadron, Royal Engineers
 3rd Airborne Squadron, Royal Engineers (Based in England)
 9th Airborne Squadron, Royal Engineers
 147th Airborne Park Squadron, Royal Engineers
 6th Airborne Division Postal Unit, Royal Engineers
 6th Airborne Divisional Signals
 63rd Company (Parachute Brigade), Royal Army Service Corps (Based in England)
 398th Company (Parachute Brigade), Royal Army Service Corps
 716th Company (Parachute Brigade), Royal Army Service Corps
 23rd (Parachute) Field Ambulance (Based in England)
 195th (Parachute) Field Ambulance
 224th (Parachute) Field Ambulance
 74th Field Hygiene Section
 16th Field Hygiene Section
 17th Field Hygiene Section
 6th Airborne Division Ordnance Field Park, Royal Army Ordnance Corps
 1st Airborne Workshops, Royal Army Ordnance Corps
 2nd Airborne Workshops, Royal Army Ordnance Corps (Based in England)
 3rd Airborne Workshops, Royal Army Ordnance Corps
 6th Airborne Division Battle School
 6th Airborne Division Training School
 6th Airborne Division Provost Company
 317th Field Security Section
 16th Field Cash Office (Light)
 6th Airborne Division Air Photographic Interpretation Section
 2nd Mobile Photographic Enlargement Section

Notes

References

 
 

World War II orders of battle